Event photography is the practice of photographing guests and occurrences at any Event or occasion where one may hire a photographer for. This is a coverage that is used around the world at occasions such as weddings, christenings, naming ceremonies, parties, birthdays, formals, dances, ceremonies, award ceremonies, funerals, meals and engagements.

History 
Photography has been used to capture every kind of moment from its very beginning, but event photography really began when the first "portable" cameras were invented and persons (or professionals) could now carry around a camera and take photographs of moments as they happened as opposed to posing a set up and sitting for it.

External links

Photography by genre
Organized events